Sir John Ware Edgar   (16 September 1839 - 4 June 1902) was a British colonial administrator in British India.

Biography
Edgar was born in 1839, the son of John Peard Edgar, Kensington and Jane Gibbings, daughter of B. Gibbings.

He joined the Bengal Civil Service in 1862, and served as an assistant magistrate and collector in Bengal, and as deputy-commissioner in Assam.

Edgar, while Deputy Commissioner of Cachar, set out on 20 December 1869 with the Inspector of Police, twenty one constables, three sepoys, three native officials and a few Lushai guides to engage with the Suakpuilala.  He succeeded in making friendly terms with the Suakpuilala. During 1870-71, Edgar revisited the Lushai Hills.  Suakpuilala executed with Edgar the only Sanad which any Lushai chief ever negotiated with the British Government, on 16 January 1871.

In 1872 he was appointed political officer with the Lushai Expedition, for which he was appointed a Companion of the Order of the Star of India (CSI) in the 1873 Birthday Honours. Following further district work he became Commissioner of Chittagong in late 1885. Two years later he was appointed Financial and Chief Secretary to the Government of Bengal, serving as such until 1892. For some months before his retirement that year, he also occupied a seat as an additional member of the Viceroy's Executive Council.

He was knighted as a Knight Commander of the Order of the Indian Empire (KCIE) in the 1889 Birthday Honours list.

In later years he devoted his time to historical studies.

He died at his villa in Florence, on 4 June 1902.

References

1839 births
1902 deaths
Indian Civil Service (British India) officers
Knights Commander of the Order of the Indian Empire
Companions of the Order of the Star of India
Members of the Council of the Governor General of India